This is a list of plant species from the genus Chamelaucium.

Species

Sources
 

List of Chamelaucium species
Lists of plants of Australia
Lists of biota of Western Australia
Chame